In folklore, the Michigan Dogman was allegedly witnessed in 1887 in Wexford County, Michigan, United States. The creature is described as a seven-foot tall, blue-eyed, or amber-eyed bipedal canine-like animal with the torso of a man and a fearsome howl that sounds like a human scream. According to legends, the Michigan Dogman appears in a ten-year cycle that falls on years ending in 7. Sightings have been reported in several locations throughout Michigan, primarily in the northwestern quadrant of the Lower Peninsula. In 1987, the legend of the Michigan Dogman gained popularity when disc jockey Steve Cook at WTCM-FM recorded a song about the creature and its reported sightings.

History 
This creature was unknown to most of the modern world until very late in the twentieth century. It is said to have been stalking the area around the Manistee River since the days when the Odawa tribes lived there. Authentic sources for sightings made prior to 1987, however, have never been documented beyond Steve Cook's song, discussed below.

The first alleged encounter of the Michigan Dogman occurred in 1887 in Wexford County, when two lumberjacks saw a creature which they described as having a man's body and a dog's head.

In 1937 in Paris, Michigan, Robert Fortney was attacked by five wild dogs and said that one of the five walked on two legs. Reports of similar creatures also came from Allegan County in the 1950s, and in Manistee and Cross Village in 1967.

Linda S. Godfrey, in her book The Beast of Bray Road, compares the Manistee sightings to a similar creature sighted in Wisconsin known as the Beast of Bray Road.

The Cook song 
In 1987  disc jockey Steve Cook at WTCM-FM in Traverse City, Michigan recorded a song titled "The Legend", which he initially played as an April Fool's Day joke. He based the songs on myths and legends from around North America, and had never heard of an actual Michigan "dogman" at the time of the recording:

Cook maintains his skepticism about the possibility of a real dogman, he had this to say about the matter:

Cook recorded the song with a keyboard backing and credited it to Bob Farley. After he played the song, Cook received calls from listeners who said that they had encountered a similar creature. In the next weeks after Cook first played the song, it was the most-requested song on the station. He also sold cassettes of the songs for four dollars, and donated proceeds from the single to an animal shelter. Over the years, Cook has received more than 100 reports of the creature's existence. In March 2010, the creature was featured in an episode of MonsterQuest. In January 2017, the creature was featured in the season 2 episode "Great Lakes: Wolfman, Dogman, Wendigo" of Monsters and Mysteries in America.

Other references to Dogman include various Youtube channels including Dogman Encounters Radio, Dogman Narratives,  Scary Stories NYC, Campfire Tales, Dogman Encounters with Jeffrey Nadolny, and Lilith Dread.

Cook later added verses to the song in 1997 after hearing a report of an animal break-in by an unknown canine at a cabin in Luther, Michigan. He re-recorded it again in 2007, with a mandolin backing.

Feature film 
In late 2011, filmmaker Rich Brauer released a film called Dogman, starring Larry Joe Campbell. The movie premiered at the State Theater in Traverse City.

The film included a brief segment of "The Gable Film", used with permission from Mike Agrusa, who received acknowledgement in the film credits.

See also 
 Beast of Bray Road
 Dog Soldiers

References 

Michigan folklore
American legendary creatures